Dave Kirzinger (born March 1, 1956) is a Canadian football offensive lineman who played professionally nine seasons for the Calgary Stampeders and Toronto Argonauts.

References

1956 births
Living people
Calgary Stampeders players
Canadian football offensive linemen
Players of Canadian football from Saskatchewan
Sportspeople from Saskatoon
Toronto Argonauts players
UBC Thunderbirds football players